Hussein is an Arabic given name.

Hussein, Hussain, Hossein, Hossain, Huseyn, Husayn, Husein or Husain (or other Romanizations) may also refer to:

Places
 Hussain, Iran, a village in West Azerbaijan Province, Iran
 Hoseyn-e Gorg, a village in Markazi Province, Iran
 Husayn, Yemen, a village in eastern Yemen
 Sheikh Hussein, holy Muslim site in Ethiopia

See also
 Hussainia, a hall for Shia rituals
 Husain, a surname
 Husseini, a surname
 Hussein, An Entertainment, a novel by Patrick O'Brian
 Al Hussein (missile), Iraqi missile
 Mullá Husayn, first Letter of the Living in the Bábí movement